Malikathazhathu Pulluvazhy Narayana Pillai (22 November 1939 – 19 May 1998), affectionately known as Nanappan among his friends, was a journalist and writer of Malayalam literature. Known for his novel, Parinamam (The Evolution), and a number of short stories including Murugan Enna Pambatty (Murugan, the Snake Charmer) and George Aaramante Kodathi (The Court of George VI), Pillai was associated with Far Eastern Economic Review and McGraw-Hill World News. He was awarded the Kerala Sahitya Akademi Award for Novel in 1991, but he declined the award.

Biography 
M. P. Narayana Pillai was born on 22 November 1939 to Thazhathu Parameshwaran Nair and Malikathazhathu Ammukutty Amma in Pulluvazhy, a village near Perumbavoor in Ernakulam district of the south Indian state of Kerala. After early schooling at the local school in Pulluvazhy, he completed his Pre-University course at Nirmala College, Muvattupuzha and moved to Banaras Hindu University from where he obtained his BSc degree in agricultural science. Subsequently, he started his career as a telephone operator at the consulate of East Germany in Delhi. Later, he joined Central Planning Commission, Delhi as an economic investigator and worked there for five years. In 1967, he moved to Hong Kong to join the Far Eastern Economic Review as the assistant editor but stayed there only for 3 years and returned to India to take up the position of the chief of publications with Mumbai-based Commerce Group in 1970. He was also associated with McGraw-Hill World News as their Indian correspondent, with periodicals such as Minerals and Metals Review  and Trial, a Malayalam weekly of Kalakaumudi and served as he chief executive officer of Asian Industries Information Center. Another of his journalistic attempts was the funding of Gulf Malayalee, a periodical for the Malayali expatriates residing in the Gulf region.

Pillai was married to Prabha Pillai, an editor of the Economic and Political Weekly who would later publish two  books named as Verpadinte Vedanakal and Ormakalude Mahanagarathil, based on her  memories of Narayan Pillai. The couple had two sons, Balakrishna Pillai and Madhavankutty Pillai, and the family lived Borivli, in Mumbai. It was here Pillai died on 19 May 1998,at the age of 58.

Writing career 
Narayana Pillai is considered by many as one of the finest writers of Malayalam fiction. It was reported that he started writing during his stay in Delhi where he met Kakkanadan and was influenced by the writer; the first story was Kallan (The Thief). Murugan Enna Pambatti, George Aramante Kodathi, Yathrakkidayil and  Njangal Asuranmar are some of his most notable short stories. Most of his short stories have been compiled in 5 anthologies viz. Murugan Enna Pambatti, 56 Sathragali, Anthikoottu, Njangal Asuranmar and M. P. Narayana Pilayude Kathakal. He wrote only one novel, Parinamam, which was selected for the Kerala Sahitya Akademi Award for Novel in 1991. However, he declined the award, requesting the government to deposit the prize money in the state treasury. He could not complete his second novel, Hanuman Seva, which was later completed by Punathil Kunjabdulla. His memoirs is titled, Avasanathe Pathuroopanottu. Samakalika Malayalam Varika, a sister publication of The New Indian Express, have instituted an annual award, M. P. Narayana Pillai Memorial Short Story Award, in his honour, which carries a prize money of  50,000 and a citation.

Selected works

Novels

Short stories

Essays and memoirs

References

Further reading

External links
 Facebook page created by his son
 
 University of Calicut library listings

1939 births
1998 deaths
Malayali people
Malayalam-language writers
Journalists from Kerala
Recipients of the Kerala Sahitya Akademi Award
20th-century Indian short story writers
Writers from Kochi
20th-century Indian novelists
20th-century Indian non-fiction writers